Parliamentary elections were held for the first time the Austrian section of the Austrian Empire in June 1848.
This group of territories would in Austria-Hungary be referred to as Cisleithania.
This happened after the Revolutions of 1848 in the Habsburg areas caused the Klemens von Metternich government to fall.
The election followed the imposition of a new constitution on 25 April by Ferdinand I. The new Imperial Council first met in Vienna on 22 July, but was then relocated to Kremsier in Moravia due to fighting, after which it became known as the Kremsier Parliament.

References

1848 elections in Europe
Cisleithanian legislative elections
1848 in the Austrian Empire
June 1848 events
Revolutions of 1848 in the Austrian Empire